Rockland Township is the name of some places in the U.S. state of Pennsylvania:

Rockland Township, Berks County, Pennsylvania
Rockland Township, Venango County, Pennsylvania

Pennsylvania township disambiguation pages